The Serbian First Football League (Serbian: Prva liga Srbije) is the second-highest football league in Serbia. The league is operated by the Serbian FA. 16 teams competed in the league for the 2016–17 season. Two teams were promoted to the Serbian SuperLiga. Four teams were relegated to the Serbian League, the third-highest division overall in the Serbian football league system. Due to extreme financial difficulties, Sloga Petrovac application for 2016–17 season was rejected. On an emergency meeting in the Serbian FA, on 18 July 2016, it was announced that Sloboda Užice would, as a consequence of Sloga's relegation, stay in the league for 2016–17 season.
The season begun in August 2016 and ended in May 2017.

2016–17 teams

League table

Results

Top goalscorers
Source: Prva liga official website

Own goals

Hat-tricks

References

External links
 Official website

Serbian First League seasons
2016–17 in Serbian football leagues
Serbia